Crandell is typically a surname. It may refer to:

People
Alexandra Crandell (born 1987), American fashion model and television personality
Bradshaw Crandell (1896–1966), American artist and illustrator
Chad Crandell (born 1975), American football player
Crandell Addington (born 1938), American entrepreneur and poker player
Dwight Crandell (1923–2009), American volcanologist
Marcus Crandell (born 1974), Canadian football player
Todd Crandell (born 1966), American triathlete

Other uses
Crandell Theatre, built by Walter S. Crandell, located in the Village of Chatham, New York
Mount Crandell, Alberta, Canada, named after Edward H. Crandell; also has a Lake Crandell

See also
Crandall (disambiguation)
Crandelles
Crannell (disambiguation)
Crendell